Germany competed at the 2008 Summer Paralympics in Beijing.

German competitors took part in table tennis and sailing events, among others.

Medallists

Archery

5 competitors:

Men

Women

Athletics

Men

Pentathlon

Women

Cycling

Men's track
Pursuit

Sprint

Time trial

Men's road

Women's track
Pursuit

Time trial

Women's road

Equestrian

Individual

Team

'#' denotes scores that did not count toward the team total.

Goalball

6 competitors:

Women
 Natalie Ball
 Conny Dietz
 Ina Fischer
 Christiane Möller
 Swetlana Otto
 Stefanie Schindler

Preliminary round

Group table

Judo

Men

Women

Powerlifting

Rowing

Sailing

CAN - Race cancelled

Shooting

Men

Women

Swimming

Men

Women

Table Tennis

Men

Women

Wheelchair Basketball

Men
 André Bienek
 Lars Christink
 Ahmet Coskun
 Florian Fischer
 Dirk Köhler-Lenz
 Andreas Kreß
 Lars Lehmann
 Björn Lohmann
 Dirk Passiwan
 Mimoun Quali
 Jens Schürmann
 Sebastian Wolk

Preliminary round - Group A

Group table

Quarterfinals

Classification game

5th place game

Women
 Alke Behrens
 Maren Butterbrodt
 Annette Kahl
 Britta Kautz
 Simone Kues
 Birgit Meitner
 Marina Mohnen
 Edina Müller
 Nora Schratz
 Gesche Schünemann
 Nicole Seifert
 Annika Zeyen

Preliminary round - Group A

Group table

Quarterfinals

Semifinals

Final

Wheelchair Fencing

Wheelchair Rugby

 Maik Baumann
 Christian Götze
 Jörg Holzem
 Salih Köseoglu
 Wolfgang Mayer
 Nacer Menezla
 Oliver Picht
 Micael Schlüter
 Wolfgang Schmitt
 Christoph Werner
 Dirk Wieschendorf

Preliminary round - Group B

Group table

Classification match

5th place match

Wheelchair Tennis

See also
Germany at the Paralympics
Germany at the 2008 Summer Olympics

References

External links
Beijing 2008 Paralympic Games Official Site
International Paralympic Committee

Nations at the 2008 Summer Paralympics
2008
Paralympics